Lissospira convexa is a species of sea snail, a marine gastropod mollusk in the family Skeneidae.

Description

Distribution
The Lissospira convexa is commonly found in the North Atlantic Ocean

References

convexa
Gastropods described in 1897